Flendish Hundred (more commonly Flendish) was a pre-Norman administrative division of the county of Cambridgeshire, England. It probably got its name from Fleam Dyke. Hundreds were intermediate administrative divisions, larger than villages and smaller than shires, that survived until the 19th century.  It was probably created in the early 10th century. Flendish was first recorded in the Domesday Book.  In the 11th century Flendish hundred contained four vills, later divided into five parishes: Fulbourn, Teversham, Hinton, and Horningsea (today, Fen Ditton and Horningsea).

Fleam Dyke was probably the base from which the forces of King Edward the Elder began to ravage the lands of the East Anglian Danes in 903.  These campaigns ended by 920 with his subjugation of the southern Danelaw.

Alternative Spellings 
Before English spelling was formalised, the spelling varied considerably showing the Germanic, Norse and Flemish cultural influences of East Anglia before the time when English was declared England's language by Edward III.

[Citation P. H. Reaney, The Place-Names of Cambridgeshire and the Isle of Ely (EPNS 19), Cambridge 1943.]

Flendish Hundred

Flamingdice, Flammindic, Flammidinc, Flammiding 1086	DB

Flammincdic, Flammigedic, Flammicgedic, Flammingedich, Flammedigedig 1086 InqEl

Flamencdic 1086	ICC

Flammedich 1155-7	P

Flamedich(e) 1175-9	P	, 1251	ElyCouch	, 1277	Ely	, 14th	Cai

Flaundishe 1553	Pat

Flem(e)dich(e), Flem(e)dych(e) 1188	P	et freq to, 1523	SR

Flemesdich 1218	SR	, 1284	FA	, 1298	Ass

Flemedic 1218	SR

Flemdik(e), Flemdyk(e) 1268, 1285	Ass

Flem(i)sdich 1279	RH

Flemdisch 1372	SR

Flem(e)dys(s)h 1457	IpmR	, 1523	SR

Flendiche 1428	FA	, 1570	SR

Flendishe, Flendyshe t. Hy 6	Cole	xxxvii, 1560	Depositions

Flendick 1570	SR

Flyndiche 1553	Pat

Flyndysshe 1557	Pat

References 

Geography of England
Cambridgeshire